Ayuba Philibus Wabba (born 22 October 1968) is a Nigerian trade union leader. He was returned as the President of the Nigeria Labour Congress for another four years during the unions leadership elections on 6 February 2019.

Early life and education 
Born in Borno State, Wabba attended school in Kawo, and then various institutions including the Imo State University. During this period, he served as president of the National Union of Health Technology Students.

Career 
After leaving education, Wabba began working for the Medical and Health Workers' Union of Nigeria, becoming first its secretary in Borno State, then as the union's national president. In 2007, he was elected as national treasurer of the Nigeria Labour Congress, then in 2015 became its president.  In 2018, he was elected as president of the International Trade Union Confederation. Wabba is an opponent of proposed Nigerian participation in the African Continental Free Trade Area.

Wabba is also the Fiwagboye of Orile-Ifo and the Zanna Ma'alama of Borno Emirate. In one of his recent struggles with the government, the governor of Kaduna State declared him wanted with other NLC officials for alleged economic sabotage and attack on public infrastructure in the state. The NLC president responded by saying he is waiting to be arrested by the government and that the five days strike was not about him but about the welfare of the workers in Kaduna State. Workers from different minsteries and cadres of the civil service joined in the protest withdrawing their services for the five days due to shortage of civil servants in the public service in the state after some of them were sacked by the state government.

References

1968 births
Living people
Nigerian trade unionists
People from Borno State
Imo State University alumni
Leaders of the International Trade Union Confederation